Alexa Guarachi and Erin Routliffe were the defending champions, but lost in the first round to Beatrice Gumulya and Abbie Myers.

Usue Maitane Arconada and Caroline Dolehide won the title, defeating Destanee Aiava and Astra Sharma in the final, 7–6(7–5), 6–4.

Seeds

Draw

Draw

References
Main Draw

Hardee's Pro Classic - Doubles
Hardee's Pro Classic